Urbana is a suburban census-designated place located in Frederick County, Maryland, United States. It is part of the Washington metropolitan area.

In August 2015, Urbana was ranked #35 in the country for Money.com "Best Places to Live 2015"  and in 2018, Urbana was ranked #9 in Maryland for Niche's Best places to live 2018.

History

18th, 19th, and 20th centuries
The Urbana area was first settled in 1730. 

Urbana is the site of Landon House, which was built in 1754 along the Rappahannock River around Fredericksburg, Virginia. It was used as a seminary for girls.  In 1840, Landon House was moved by boat to Washington and then by oxcarts to its present site in Urbana.  Landon House later served as a military academy and a hospital during the Civil War. Confederate General J.E.B. Stuart's officers held a dance at Landon House in 1862. During the dance, Union cavalry advanced on the house, but the Confederate military drove the Union forces away and the dance continued.

Zion Episcopal Church was built in 1802 and served as a house of worship until badly damaged by fire in 1961. Since 2005, it has been restored to its original condition as a museum. Amelung House and Glassworks were listed on the National Register of Historic Places in 1973. Stancioff House was listed in 1975, and Fat Oxen in 1979.

2000–2010
The original Urbana community has been somewhat overshadowed by recent developments, such as the Villages of Urbana and the Urbana Highlands. These developments, begun in 1999, have swelled Urbana's population and put a strain on the community's school system, police force, and utilities.

In 2006, the Urbana Regional Library and Senior Center opened on Amelung Street.

Urbana has some of the highest quality ratings for Maryland's elementary, middle, and high schools. The diverse population was named "The 2009 Best Selling Community in Maryland". The community has two swimming pools, a new district park, plenty of tennis and basketball courts, and is close to the I-270 technology corridor.

2010–present 
As of the 2010 census, Urbana had a population of 9,175 people, an increase from 622 residents in 2000. As of 2020, Urbana's population is about 11,800. Urbana has also steadily gained various shops and restaurants over the years and a new elementary school called Sugarloaf Elementary School. New townhouses and apartments have been built near the Urbana High School and several houses in the new Stone Barn Village development on the western side of the town.

Geography 

Urbana is located in southeastern Frederick County, centered at the intersection of Maryland Routes 80 and 355. Interstate 270 forms the southwestern edge of the community, with access from Exit 26 (MD 80).

Climate 
Urbana is part of the humid subtropical climate zone, with hot, humid summers, cool winters, and ample precipitation year-round. It is above the Fall Line, which gives it slightly lower year-round temperatures than cities to the south, such as Washington, D.C.

Urbana experiences rain an average of 112.6 days of the year.

Recreation 

Urbana offers many walking trails and small parks throughout the villages, making it possible to go almost anywhere in the town completely on foot. Urbana also offers basketball courts, tennis courts, and dozens of smaller parks and small bench areas in nearly every neighborhood. The primary recreational facilities in Urbana are:

Urbana District Park 

Finished in 2012, the Urbana District Park is a  park located near the intersection of Md. Route 355 and Lew Wallace Street. Villages of Urbana developer Tom Natelli dedicated the land for the park in 2004. The goal of the first phase of the new development of Urbana District Park was to provide athletic facilities and several passive recreational amenities for the southern region of Frederick County. The $5.9 million Phase I construction included two multipurpose fields, one football/lacrosse field, one baseball field, one softball field, one little league field, a new entrance drive, parking, walking/biking trails, water and electric utilities, restrooms, picnic pavilions, playground, a park maintenance facility, landscaping/reforestation and various site amenities. The site also contains three parking lots for a total of 466 parking spaces. The park's walking trails connect directly to the main Villages of Urbana walking trails. Today, the park houses a total of five baseball fields and a soccer field.

Shafer's Mill Recreation Center 
Shafer's Mill is home one of two limited-access pools and fitness centers within the Villages of Urbana. This is the second pool, located at 9228 Shafer's Mill Dr, in the new Urbana district. The Shafer's Mill Recreation Center includes a fitness center for Association members as well as a community room that is available for community groups, events, and classes.

Anthony Natelli Community Center 

The Anthony Natelli Community Center is located on Harris St, inside of the Villages of Urbana. Facilities include a large swimming pool complex, meeting rooms, and community event facilities. In addition, the center has four tennis courts, a basketball court, and a pool that includes a recreational and lap pool (both of which are outdoors). The Anthony Natelli Community Center hosts numerous recreation and fitness programs as well as board and committee meetings and is available for rent.

Urbana Community Park 
The oldest park of the original Urbana community, much of its use has been overshadowed by the new Urbana District Park and the recent Sugarloaf Elementary School construction. The park features two playgrounds, tennis courts, and multiple baseball fields.

Natelli Family YMCA 
Completed in 2021, construction of a 62,000 sq. ft. YMCA, with an Olympic-sized swimming pool shared for Frederick County Public Schools (Maryland) competitive sports, was made available.

Economy 

Due to the proximity of nearby I-270 and growth of the Villages of Urbana and creation of the Urbana Corporate Center, Urbana has quickly become a favorable enclave for both housing and business. As of 2016, Urbana is home to the Fannie Mae Data Center and is the current headquarters for Legal & General America. There is also a market located on Sugarloaf Parkway.

The Legal & General American division is headquartered in Urbana, and the US Social Security Administration and the Fannie Mae data centers are located in the Urbana Corporate Center.

The Fannie Mae Regional Data Center was the first building constructed in the Urbana Corporate Center. Built in 2004, the facility is a 220,000 sq. ft. state of the art office and data center facility with 90,000 sq. ft. of office space, a 60,000 sq. ft. data center, and a 70,000 sq. ft. MEP facility. The Fannie Mae Data center was one of the first data centers in the country to receive LEED certification which included sediment control and storm water management credits.

Demographics 

As of the 2010 U.S. Census, there were 9,175 people and 2,804 households residing in the Urbana census-designated place. Ethnically, the population is made up of 66.7% White, 9.0% African-American, .3% American Indian or Alaska Native, 17.5% Asian, .0% Native Hawaiian or Pacific Islander, 4.1% of two or more races, and 10.1% Hispanic or Latino of any race.

Government 
Despite rapid development, Urbana has not been incorporated as a town or a city. It has no official mayor or city council and is governed by Frederick County. It is represented by District 2 Council Member Steve McKay of the Frederick County council.

Schools
Public schools in Urbana are part of the Frederick County Public Schools (Maryland) system.

Urbana High School has been recognized as one of Maryland's top 25 engineering schools by the A. James Clark School of Engineering of The University of Maryland. In addition, UHS has been named one of America's Top High Schools in Newsweek's 2015 High School Rankings. Urbana also ranks #1 in students taking AP exams (509), number of AP exams taken (979), percent of Total AP Students Scoring 3+ (77% - 392), and AP Mean Score 3.37. In 2011, Michelle Shearer got awarded with the National Teacher of the Year by Barack Obama. She was an AP Chemistry Teacher at the High School.
Urbana Middle School
Urbana Elementary School
Centerville Elementary School
Sugarloaf Elementary School

Major roads
 Maryland Route 355
 Maryland Route 80
 Interstate 270

Culture

Events
 Centerville Elementary School holds a star-spangled celebration. The Urbana Volunteer Fire Department's Carnival takes place in mid-July. Numerous smaller celebrations are held at the local pool and community center.

References

External links

Urbana website/forum

Census-designated places in Frederick County, Maryland
Census-designated places in Maryland